Rogaland was a Norwegian newspaper, published in Stavanger in Rogaland county.

Rogaland was started in 1905, published in the city Haugesund under the name Dag. Already in 1907 its name was changed and its headquarters moved to Stavanger. It went defunct in 1919.

References

Newspapers established in 1905
Publications disestablished in 1919
Defunct newspapers published in Norway
Mass media in Stavanger
Mass media in Haugesund
Companies based in Stavanger
Companies based in Haugesund
1905 establishments in Norway